Evolución is Menudo's 16th album (14th in Spanish). This album features new member Ricky Martin. Ricky Martin replaced Ricky Meléndez, the last member to exit from the original line-up. Ricky Meléndez was nearing his 17th birthday when it was decided who was going to be his replacement. Ricky Martin wasn't their first choice. Ray’s brother Raul Reyes was working the backup vocals and was considered to join the group, also Tico Santana was the name of a kid considered to join the group at that time, but for unknown reasons it was decided to give Ricky Martin the position. This is also the last album Ray Reyes recorded as a member of the group. It received a nomination for a Grammy Award for Best Latin Pop Album. Ricky Martin sings lead vocal on "Rayo De Luna", one of the group's most popular songs of the era.

In Brazil, where the group was very successful (their previous album Mania which sold over 1 million copies in the country) the album had advanced orders of 700,000 copies.

Track listing 
"Sabes a Chocolate" [4:13] - Singer: Robby Rosa
"Yo No Fui" [3:31] - Singer: Ray Reyes
"Yo Seré Tu Bailarín" [2:59] - Singer: Charlie Massó
"Parque Del Oeste" [3:51] - Singer: Robby Rosa
"Amor Primero" [3:22] - Singer: Charlie Massó
"Agua De Limón" [4:12] - Singer: Charlie Massó
"No Hay Reflexión" [2:59] - Singer: Roy Rosselló
"Persecución" [3:10] - Singer: Ray Reyes
"Rayo De Luna" [3:42] - Singer: Ricky Martin
"Me Gusta Esa Chica" [3:44] - Singer: Robby Rosa

References 

Menudo (band) albums
1984 albums